Lampanyctus turneri is a species of lanternfish. It is found in the Indian and western Pacific Oceans. It grows to  standard length.

References

Lampanyctus
Fish of the Indian Ocean
Fish of the Pacific Ocean
Fish described in 1934
Taxa named by Henry Weed Fowler